Plug-in electric vehicles in Washington may refer to:

 Plug-in electric vehicles in Washington (state)
 Plug-in electric vehicles in Washington, D.C.